North Leeds is an unincorporated community located in the town of Leeds, Columbia County, Wisconsin, United States.

Transportation
North Leeds is the major junction of Route 51, WIS 22, and WIS 60. US 51 runs south to DeForest and Madison. US 51 North has a short cosigning with WIS 60, which heads west to Arlington and Lodi, before 51 heads north toward Poynette and Portage.  WIS 60 East heads to Columbus. This is where WIS 22 begins and heads north to Wyocena, Pardeeville, and Montello.

Images

References

Unincorporated communities in Columbia County, Wisconsin
Unincorporated communities in Wisconsin